A privilege sign is a retail store sign provided by a manufacturer, with the manufacturer's branding on it. The signs may be provided to the store at no cost, in return for the manufacturer's advertising on the sign. Examples include Coca-Cola signs, bar/tavern signage provided by breweries containing that brewery's brand logo above the establishment's name, and painted signs on sides of shops.

Privilege signs are no longer popular with manufacturers or stores in the United States, slowly disappearing from storefronts in that country. However, it remains a common fixture in other countries, such as sari-sari stores in the Philippines, where common sponsors of privilege signs include soft drinks, telecommunications services, and soap brands.

Similar such signs still appear on independent newsagents in the United Kingdom with Lycamobile and Coca-Cola being among the most prominent of brands to advertise.

See also 
 Ghost sign

References 

Signage
Advertising
Retail processes and techniques
Retail store elements